Patrick Delamontagne (born 18 June 1957 in La Bouéxière, Ille-et-Vilaine) is a former  French footballer, regarded as one of the greatest players to have played for Stade Rennais, as well as one of the greatest ever Breton players. He is the father of the professional golfer François Delamontagne.

International honours
3 international caps, 0 goals. 
 15 May 1981, Paris: France-Brazil (1–3), friendly match.
 31 August 1982, Paris: France-Poland (0–4), friendly match.
 16 June 1987, Oslo: France-Norway (0–0), 1988 UEFA European Football Championship qualifying match.

References and notes

External links 

Profile at FFF 

1957 births
Living people
French footballers
France international footballers
Association football midfielders
Stade Rennais F.C. players
Stade Lavallois players
AS Nancy Lorraine players
AS Monaco FC players
Olympique de Marseille players
Ligue 1 players
Sportspeople from Ille-et-Vilaine
Footballers from Brittany